Kadist is an interdisciplinary contemporary arts organization with an international contemporary art collection. In addition to being a collecting body, Kadist hosts artists residencies and produces exhibitions, publications, and public events. The first location was opened in Paris in 2006 by Vincent Worms and Sandra Terdjman, and a San Francisco, California location was added in 2011 in the Mission District.

Programs

 Exhibitions: With a gallery space both in Paris and San Francisco, Kadist hosts exhibitions by international artists and curators, often in coordination with their residency program. Artists they have worked with include Ryan Gander, Danh Vo, Francis Alÿs, and Roman Ondàk. Additionally they have co-produced large scale artist projects, including "Klau Mich" by Dora García and "Muster" by Clemens von Wedemeyer at DOCUMENTA (13).
 Residencies: Kadist provides residencies for a wide range of creative activities including and not limited to new artistic productions, publications, writers and curators. Recent residents include artists Young-Hae Chang Heavy Industries, bookstore Ooga Booga and publications White Fungus, Nero, and Fillip.
 Events: Kadist San Francisco hosts an ongoing series of events, frequently on Wednesdays, which have involved screenings, performances, conversations, and game shows.

Mission

From their mission statement: "We believe contemporary artists make an important contribution to a progressive society, their work often addressing key issues of our time. KADIST is a non-profit organization that encourages this engagement and is dedicated to extending the reach of artists represented in its collection to a global audience, thus facilitating new connections across cultures. Its programs develop collaborations with artists, curators and many art organizations around the world. Local programs in KADIST’s hubs of Paris and San Francisco include exhibitions, public events, residencies and educational initiatives. Complemented by an  active online network, they aim at creating vibrant conversations about contemporary art and ideas."

Collection

The Kadist collection was established in 2001 and includes film and video, performance, painting, photography, drawings and prints, sculpture, and installations. Ultimately the collection not bound by geography, but it focuses on four greater regions: the Middle East, Asia, The Americas and Europe. Kadist has also supported the production of artworks, and commissioned artworks through its residency program, and in collaboration with international biennials—some of which are part of the collection.

References

External links
 
Kadist Art Foundation in Paper Magazine
"Trio of Art Entities Opens in San Francisco's Mission District" in Art In America
Episode 304 Kadist Art Foundation
Review of exhibition Living as Form the Nomadic Version, 2011''
Review of exhibition with Young-Hae Chang Heavy Industries, 2013
 Review of exhibition Enacting Populism, 2012 in Frieze
 Review of exhibition L'exigence de la saudade, 2013 in Artforum
 Review of exhibition with Goldin+Senneby, 2010 in art agenda
 Review of Lives Between exhibition
KADIST and e-flux present Ways of Reading Symposium, February 1, 2020

Art in the San Francisco Bay Area
Arts centers in California
Arts centres in France
Art galleries established in 2006
Art galleries established in 2011
2011 establishments in California
Arts foundations based in the United States
Contemporary art galleries in the United States